Seppeltsfield may refer to:

Seppeltsfield (wine), the winery in the Barossa Valley, South Australia
Seppeltsfield, South Australia, the township in the Barossa Valley